Arno Köörna (2 February 1926 Nõo, Tartu County – 21 December 2017) was a Soviet and Estonian economist.

Since 1972, he was a member of Estonian Academy of Sciences. 1990–1994, he was President of Estonian Academy of Sciences.

Awards 
 Medal of Estonian Academy of Sciences
 Order of the Red Banner of Labour (1976)
 Order of Friendship of Peoples (1986)
 Order of the White Star, 3rd class

References

1926 births
2017 deaths
20th-century Estonian economists
People from Nõo Parish
Hugo Treffner Gymnasium alumni
Members of the Estonian Academy of Sciences
University of Tartu alumni
Academic staff of the University of Tartu
Eighth convocation members of the Supreme Soviet of the Soviet Union
Members of the Supreme Soviet of the Estonian Soviet Socialist Republic, 1975–1980
Members of the Supreme Soviet of the Estonian Soviet Socialist Republic, 1980–1985
Members of the Supreme Soviet of the Estonian Soviet Socialist Republic, 1985–1990
Recipients of the Order of Friendship of Peoples
Recipients of the Order of the Red Banner of Labour
Recipients of the Order of the White Star, 3rd Class
Estonian economists
Soviet economists
Burials at Metsakalmistu